Mount Pisgah, Pennsylvania may refer to the following peaks in the U.S.:
Mount Pisgah, Bradford County, Pennsylvania
Mount Pisgah, Carbon County, Pennsylvania
Mount Pisgah, York County, Pennsylvania